Joanna Carver Colcord (March 18, 1882 – April 8, 1960) was pioneering social worker, and author. Born at sea, she was also notable for publishing texts on the language, work songs, and sea shanties of American seamen during the early 20th century.

Early life
Both of Colcord's parents, Jane French (Sweetser) and Captain Lincoln Alden Colcord, came from Maine families with generations-long traditions of life on and around the sea. Lincoln Alden Colcord delivered his daughter Joanna on board his sailing ship, the Charlotte A. Littlefield, in the southwest Pacific near New Caledonia. The ship left Newcastle, New South Wales and was sailing to Yokohama, Japan. 

Aside from time spent on shore at Penobscot Bay or in Searsport, Maine, Joanna and her younger brother, Lincoln Ross Colcord, spent most of their childhood at sea.

Education and early career
Jane Colcord tutored her children at sea, and Joanna's high school education was by correspondence course. She also became adept at geography and mathematics through first-hand experience aboard the ship. She would recall later that in addition to these subjects, she also learned concepts such as racial equality, self-control, orderliness, and a sense of duty.

Beginning in 1902, Joanna studied at the University of Maine, receiving her B.S. in chemistry in 1906 and M.S. in biological chemistry in 1909.

Colcord was unsatisfied with the positions available to her in applied chemistry, and a former teacher suggested she consider social service. In 1910–1911, she studied social work at the New York School of Philanthropy, later known as the New York School of Social Work.

Career in social work
Colcord’s career began in 1911 with position for the New York Charity Organization Society. During her time with the COS, she also spent time with the American Red Cross in the Virgin Islands during 1920-21. She left the COS in 1925 for a position with the Minnesota Family Welfare Association as General Secretary. In 1929 she became the leader of the  Charity Organization Division of the Russel Sage Foundation in New York, a position she held until 1945.  She was an advocate of professional training and standards in her field, as well as scientific research and administration. During the Great Depression she advocated for private social work to support federal relief and welfare provisions, and during the New Deal, she became a liaison between private social work and the federal government’s welfare and relief administrators. She eventually became critical of aspects of the Roosevelt administration’s categorical approach to relief, issues in public provision, as well as in other areas.

Late life
Health problems, including circulatory problems and diabetes, forced Colcord to retire in 1944. In November 1950, she married longtime friend and colleague Frank J. Bruno, a professor of applied sociology at Washington University in St. Louis who had become a widower several months before. After Bruno's death in 1955, Colcord moved to Lebanon, Indiana to live with her stepson. She died there in 1960 from a stroke.

Works
Colcord had a successful career as an author on the culture of seafaring as well as in social work. In 1924, she published a compilation of American sea songs, Roll and Go: Songs of American Sailormen, and in 1938, a greatly expanded edition published as Songs of American Sailormen). In 1945 she published Sea Language Comes Ashore, and she was also the author of various articles published in the maritime journal The American Neptune.

Social work

Life at sea

References

Further reading

 
 
 
Chambers, Clarke.  Notable American Women

Stadum, Beverly.  Biographical Dictionary of Social Welfare in America.

Proceedings of the National Conference of Social Welfare (NCSW)

External links
 Works by Joanna Colcord at Internet Archive.
  This searchable collection includes photographs of and by Joanna Colcord along with other information about her family.

1882 births
1960 deaths
American social workers
People born at sea
Social workers